Pressboard is a class of cellulose-based material constructed of several layers (plies) of paper which, when compressed using a combination of heat and pressure, form a stiff, dense material in a range of weights.  Pressboard has been widely used in traditional school and office products such as spiral-bound notebooks and three-ring binders, but its unique physical characteristics lend itself readily to a variety of end-uses, including (but not limited to) document storage, filing supplies (classification and file folders), report covers, folding cartons, tags, labels, and industrial applications.  It is commonly used to make the back panels of radios and some televisions.  Pressboard may be converted using a number of different techniques (scoring, folding, die-cutting), and accepts a range of value-add decorating techniques (coating, foil-stamping, screen-printing, and embossing).  Pressboard may contain recycled fiber content (including post-consumer waste), and is typically itself recyclable and biodegradable, making it an environmentally-sound choice for those seeking an alternative to petroleum-derived substrates. Pressboard has also been made from cornstalks.

See Also
 Fiberboard

References

Paper products